Notiosciadium is a genus of flowering plants belonging to the family Apiaceae. Its only species is Notiosciadium pampicola. Its native range is Northeastern Argentina to Uruguay.

References

Apioideae
Monotypic Apioideae genera